Steven Greenstreet (born March 14, 1979) is an American documentary filmmaker, known for the controversial film, 8: The Mormon Proposition, which was selected to premiere at the 2010 Sundance Film Festival. Currently residing in New York City,  
he has also worked as a video investigative journalist for The Huffington Post Investigative Fund and a video producer for the US State Department.

Career 
Greenstreet's feature debut, This Divided State (2005), captures the agitated climate surrounding Michael Moore's invitation to speak at Utah Valley State College shortly before the 2004 presidential elections.  The largely conservative community of Orem erupted with controversy, which Greenstreet approaches from all sides of the debate. The student council’s decision to book Moore was met with protests, petitions, threats, lawsuits, a $25,000 bribe, and even a special appearance by Sean Hannity, who gives a talk on campus only a few days before Moore’s arrival. Juxtaposing candidly personal interviews with shots of unruly demonstrations, the film becomes a microcosm of the national political divisions and the debates surrounding free speech.

Greenstreet illustrates the escalating obesity epidemic in America with his documentary Killer at Large (2008).  The film investigates disturbing trends in how not only food addiction, but stress and fear, under-regulation and misinformation all contribute to the nation’s swelling weight problems.   
Examining the often unhealthy state of school lunches and negative influence of kid-oriented advertising, the documentary reveals connections between the government and the food industry, exposing how children are the real victims of this obesity crisis.  
Highlighting the example of twelve-year-old Brook Bates, whose 2006 liposuction surgery made national headlines, the film contemplates how the indoctrination of children to perpetuate unhealthy habits will supersede laying the blame on personal accountability.

The premiere of 8: The Mormon Proposition (2010) at Sundance was met with a lengthy standing ovation despite the intense controversy surrounding it. 
The film was inspired by ballot measures like California’s "Prop 8," designed to legally prohibit same-sex marriage.  Addressing the estimated $22 million Mormons had raised along with internal church documents, the film unravels an extensive campaign carried out by the Church of Jesus Christ of Latter-day Saints (LDS Church) with intent to influence California’s voters. Contrasting hard statistics with emotionally charged testimonials from gays and families, 8: The Mormon Proposition reveals the detrimental effect of the LDS church’s persistent stance on homosexuality. The church has declined all of the filmmakers’ requests for interviews; LDS spokesman Michael Purdy has commented on the matter, “We have not seen ‘8: The Mormon Proposition.’  However, judging from the trailer and background material online, it appears that accuracy and truth are rare commodities in this film. Clearly, anyone looking for balance and thoughtful discussion of a serious topic will need to look elsewhere.”

In February 2013, it was announced that Greenstreet's next project was a documentary on pop singer Kesha.  Greenstreet, along with Lagan Sebert, followed Kesha over two years as she performed in various countries and then returned to the U.S. to record her sophomore album, Warrior.  The documentary was released by MTV and premiered in April 2013.

Since 2019 Greenstreet has hosted The Basement Office, a New York Post Youtube series concerning UFOs.

Filmography 
 The Basement Office (2019–) (director/producer/host)
 The Curse of Don's Plum (2019) (producer)
 The Banker Suicides (2016) (producer)
 Kesha: My Crazy Beautiful Life (2013) (co-director/producer)
 8: The Mormon Proposition (2010) (co-director/producer)
 Killer at Large (2008) (director/producer)
 This Divided State (2005) (director/producer)

References

External links 
 Steven Greenstreet Homepage
 8: The Mormon Proposition Official Site
 

American documentary filmmakers
1979 births
Living people